Sergio Omar Gómez (born 19 July 1981) is an Argentine football manager and former player who played mainly as a midfielder.

Playing career
Born in Pilar, Buenos Aires, Gómez began his career with Platense in 2001, playing three Primera B Nacional matches with the club. He then resumed his career in the lower leagues, notably representing Leandro N. Alem for three years.

Managerial career
In 2012, Gómez met Favio Orsi while working in the coaching staff of Oscar Santángelo at Fénix. In April 2013, after Santángelo resigned, both Gómez and Orsi were named managers.

In June 2014, Gómez and Orsi were appointed in charge of Deportivo Español. The duo moved to Flandria in August 2015, and led the side to a first-ever promotion to the Primera B Nacional in their first season in charge, after winning the Primera B Metropolitana.

On 2 May 2018, after Flandria's relegation, both Gómez and Orsi left the side, and the duo took over Almagro on 5 June. They resigned the following 24 February, and both were named in charge of San Martín de Tucumán on 8 May 2019.

Dismissed by San Martín on 6 April 2021, Gómez and Orsi were named in charge of Ferro Carril Oeste on 20 July. Both resigned from the latter side on 20 December.

On 10 April 2022, Gómez and Orsi were appointed managers of Primera División side Godoy Cruz, in the place of Diego Flores. The duo left on a mutual agreement on 28 October.

Honours

Manager
Flandria
Primera B Metropolitana: 2016

References

External links

1981 births
Living people
Sportspeople from Buenos Aires Province
Argentine footballers
Association football defenders
Primera Nacional players
Club Atlético Platense footballers
Villa Dálmine footballers
Club Atlético San Miguel footballers
Club Atlético Acassuso footballers
Club Atlético Fénix players
Club Leandro N. Alem players
Sportivo Dock Sud players
Argentine football managers
Primera B Nacional managers
Deportivo Español managers
Almagro managers
San Martín de Tucumán managers
Ferro Carril Oeste managers
Godoy Cruz Antonio Tomba managers